The giant mole shrew (Anourosorex schmidi) is a species of red-toothed shrew native to the southeastern slopes of the Himalaya of Bhutan and India.

References

giant mole shrew
Mammals of Bhutan
Fauna of Sikkim
Fauna of Eastern Himalaya
giant mole shrew

Fauna of Assam